Monodontomerus obscurus is a parasitic wasp in the family Torymidae. It is native to Europe and has been introduced to North America.

List of Hosts:

Osmia

Stelis chlorocyanea 

Bolivaria brachyptera oothecae

References

Chalcidoidea
Insects described in 1833